Olnhausen (alternative name: Ohlhausen; historical variants: Olnhausen, Ohlhausen, Olhausen,  Ohlhaussen, Ahlhausen, Aalhausen, Aalhaus) is a village in Baden-Wurttemberg with an area of  4.57 km2, in the district of Heilbronn, near Jagsthausen. Olnhausen has a population of about 300.

Towns in Baden-Württemberg